is a Japanese footballer currently playing as a defender for Montedio Yamagata.

Career statistics

Club
.

Notes

References

External links

1997 births
Living people
Sportspeople from Tokyo Metropolis
Association football people from Tokyo Metropolis
Niigata University of Health and Welfare alumni
Japanese footballers
Association football defenders
J3 League players
AC Nagano Parceiro players